Kentucky Route 1 (KY 1) is a  state highway in the U.S. state of Kentucky. It originates at a junction with KY 3, one mile (1.6 km) east of Cadmus in Lawrence County. The route continues through Grayson in Carter County to terminate at US 23 in Greenup in Greenup County. Part of the highway is co-signed with the Jenny Wiley Trail. Segments of KY 1 are built upon the old Eastern Kentucky Railroad. KY 1 follows parts of the Little Sandy River and parts of a smaller fork of the Little Sandy called the Little Fork upstream of Grayson.

Kentucky Route 1 allows access to Greenbo Lake State Resort Park and River Bend Golf Course, as well to the Oldtown Covered Bridge and the Jesse Stuart Nature Preserve. For general travel between Grayson and Greenup, Kentucky Route 67 is suggested over the much narrower and twisting Route 1.

Caney Falls, on the Little Fork of the Little Sandy, is to the south of Route 1, between Grayson and Route 3.

Route description
The route originates at a junction with KY 3, one mile (1.6 km) east of Cadmus in Lawrence County and winds southwest for  until it meets KY 828 and turns more toward the west. At KY 201 in Webbville KY 1 turns toward the northwest, then toward the north in Carter County. In Grayson KY 1 overlaps with US 60, crosses over Interstate 64, meets the eastern terminus of KY 9 (AA Highway), and intersects with KY 7.

Major intersections

References

Further reading
 
 
 

0001
0001
0001
0001